Liu Binjie (born September 1948) is a Chinese politician. He currently serves as the Chair of the Education, Science, Culture and Public Health Committee of the National People's Congress. He was most well-known for serving as the director of the General Administration of Press and Publication and the director of National Copyright Administration between 2007 and 2013. He also served as the deputy head and director of executive office of the national working group of "Eliminating pornography and illegal publications".

Biography
Born in Changwu, Shaanxi Province, Liu started working in April 1968. He joined Communist Party of China in August 1971. He graduated from Institute of Foreign Studies at Beijing Normal University, majoring western economics, and from department of philosophy in Graduate School of Chinese Academy of Social Sciences with a master's degree in Marxist epistemology.

In 1995, he became a member of CPC party group, governor assistant and secretary general in Sichuan people's government. In October 1999, he was appointed as a standing committee member of CPC Sichuan committee, secretary general of the provincial government and the head of provincial propaganda department. In April 2002, he was promoted to vice president and CPC party group member of General Administration of Press and Publication of PRC.  In November 2004, he was additionally appointed as vice head and director of executive office of national working group of Eliminating pornography and illegal publications. He became vice secretary of CPC party group in General Administration of Press and Publication in November 2006, He was promoted to secretary of CPC party group and president of General Administration of Press and Publication, and president of National Copyright Administration in April 2007.

Liu was a member of 17th Central Committee of the Communist Party of China.  When he left office as chief of the General Administration for Press and Publication, the department he once headed was merged into the State Administration of Press, Publication, Radio, Film and Television (SARFT).  Liu then joined the Science, Education, and Technology Committee of the National People's Congress.

Controversy
In April 2012, exiled Chinese writer Ma Jian, with a cross made of red paint over his face, called Chinese publishers a "mouthpiece of the Chinese communist party" after being "manhandled" while attempting to present a copy of his banned book Beijing Coma to Liu Binjie at the London Book Fair.

References

External links
 Liu Binjie's profile at gapp.gov.cn
 Liu Binjie's profile at ncac.gov.cn

Living people
1948 births
People's Republic of China politicians from Shaanxi
Chinese Communist Party politicians from Shaanxi
Political office-holders in Sichuan
Politicians from Xianyang